Attila Csaba Fiola (born 17 February 1990) is a Hungarian professional footballer who plays as a right-back for Fehérvár FC and the Hungary national team.

Club career
On 31 August 2016, he was signed by Nemzeti Bajnokság I club Videoton.

International career
Fiola was selected for the Hungary national team's Euro 2016 squad. On 14 June 2016, Fiola played in the first group match in a 2–0 victory over Austria at the UEFA Euro 2016 Group F match at Nouveau Stade de Bordeaux, Bordeaux, France.

On 1 June 2021, he was included in the final 26-man squad to represent Hungary at the rescheduled UEFA Euro 2020 tournament. On 19 June 2021, Fiola scored against France in Hungary's second group-stage game; the game finished 1–1. His goal celebration also gained instant fame as he leaped over a barrier into a media section and wildly banged on the desk of a reporter visibly frightening her. He later apologized and explained that he saw her looking downwards and thought that she was on her phone and wanted to bring her attention to that they had just scored.

Career statistics

Club

International
.

Scores and results list Hungary's goal tally first, score column indicates score after each Fiola goal.

Honours

Paks
Hungarian League Cup: 2010–11

Videoton
 Nemzeti Bajnokság I: 2017-18
 Hungarian Cup: 2018-19

References

External links
Paksi FC Official Website
HLSZ
MLSZ

1990 births
Living people
People from Szekszárd
Hungarian footballers
Hungary international footballers
Association football defenders
Paksi FC players
Puskás Akadémia FC players
Fehérvár FC players
Nemzeti Bajnokság I players
UEFA Euro 2016 players
UEFA Euro 2020 players
Sportspeople from Tolna County